FK Kražantė (lt Kelmės krepšinio ir futbolo klubas "Kražantė") was a Lithuanian football team from the city of Kelmė. In 2001 season was in First division I Lyga. The team dissolved in 2006.

History 
Refounded in 1994 as part of basketball and football club "Kražantė" in Kelmė.

The team was dissolved after the 2006 season.

Seasons

Colors 
 Green and white. Later was green/yellow.

Kit evoliution

References

External links 
 I Lyga Website

Football clubs in Lithuania
1926 establishments in Lithuania
Association football clubs established in 1926